André Riedl (born October 10, 1940) is a politician from Quebec, Canada. He was a Member of the National Assembly for the electoral district of Iberville from 2007 to 2008.

Born in the Saint-Henri neighbourhood in Montreal on October 10, 1940, Riedl went on a training course with the Canadian Forces in 1957. He was later for nine years the president of BOC Gaz Canada, a gas and equipment supplier. He also did international public speaking and was involved in the Missisquoi and Magog-Orford Chamber of Commerce. He once said that "unions are a necessary evil".
 
Riedl was first elected in the 2007 election as a member of the Action démocratique du Québec (ADQ) with 42% of the vote. Liberal incumbent Jean Rioux finished third with 25% of the vote.  Riedl took office on April 12, 2007. On October 23, 2008, Riedl crossed the floor to the governing Liberal Party.

Footnotes

External links
 

1940 births
Action démocratique du Québec MNAs
French Quebecers
Living people
Politicians from Montreal
Quebec Liberal Party MNAs
21st-century Canadian politicians